Shahrak-e Sofla (also Romanized as Shahrak-e Soflá; also known as Shārāk-e Pā’īn, Sharīkeh Pāin, and Sharīkeh-ye Pā’īn) is a village in Khosrowabad Rural District, Chang Almas District, Bijar County, Kurdistan Province, Iran. At the 2006 census, its population was 296, in 67 families. The village is populated by Kurds.

References 

Towns and villages in Bijar County
Kurdish settlements in Kurdistan Province